The 1991 Pontiac Excitement 400 was the second stock car race of the 1991 NASCAR Winston Cup Series and the 37th iteration of the event. The race was held on Sunday, February 24, 1991, before an audience of 51,000 in Richmond, Virginia, at Richmond International Raceway, a 0.75 miles (1.21 km) D-shaped oval. The race took the scheduled 400 laps to complete. Battling to the finish, Richard Childress Racing driver Dale Earnhardt would manage to defend against Hendrick Motorsports driver Ricky Rudd in the final laps of the race to take his 49th career NASCAR Winston Cup Series victory and his first victory of the season. To fill out the top three, the aforementioned Rudd and Leo Jackson Motorsports driver Harry Gant would finish second and third, respectively.

Background 

Richmond International Raceway (RIR) is a 3/4-mile (1.2 km), D-shaped, asphalt race track located just outside Richmond, Virginia in Henrico County. It hosts the Monster Energy NASCAR Cup Series and Xfinity Series. Known as "America's premier short track", it formerly hosted a NASCAR Camping World Truck Series race, an IndyCar Series race, and two USAC sprint car races.

Entry list 

 (R) denotes rookie driver.

*Fired after first-round qualifying and replaced by Bobby Hillin Jr. for the race.

Qualifying 
Qualifying was split into two rounds. The first round was held on Friday, February 22, at 3:00 PM EST. Each driver would have one lap to set a time. During the first round, the top 20 drivers in the round would be guaranteed a starting spot in the race. If a driver was not able to guarantee a spot in the first round, they had the option to scrub their time from the first round and try and run a faster lap time in a second round qualifying run, held on Saturday, February 23, at 11:00 AM EST. As with the first round, each driver would have one lap to set a time. For this specific race, positions 21-34 would be decided on time, and depending on who needed it, a select amount of positions were given to cars who had not otherwise qualified but were high enough in owner's points; up to two were given. If needed, a past champion who did not qualify on either time or provisionals could use a champion's provisional, adding one more spot to the field.

No drivers would fail to qualify.

Full qualifying results

Race results

Standings after the race 

Drivers' Championship standings

Note: Only the first 10 positions are included for the driver standings.

References 

1991 NASCAR Winston Cup Series
NASCAR races at Richmond Raceway
February 1991 sports events in the United States
1991 in sports in North Carolina